Lester Shorr (April 11, 1907 - July 28, 1992) was an American cinematographer. He won a Primetime Emmy Award in the category Outstanding Cinematography for his work on the television program Medic. Shorr died in July 1992 in Los Angeles, California, at the age of 85.

References

External links 

1907 births
1992 deaths
People from Brooklyn
American cinematographers
Primetime Emmy Award winners
Burials at Mount Sinai Memorial Park Cemetery